Chordale Booker (born May 7, 1991) is an American professional boxer promoted non-exclusively under Premier Boxing Champions.

Amateur career 
As an amateur, he compiled a record of 111-19 fighting out of New York Athletic Club, and was a two-time New York Metro Champion (2013, 2014),  a three-time New York Boxing Champion (2012, 2013, 2014), and the top ranked middleweight champion in the U.S. in 2015, earning him a spot in the 2016 Olympic Boxing Trials where he lost a decision to eventual Olympian Charles Conwell by a point. Despite a late start in the sport, Booker quickly rose to become one of the most accomplished amateurs in his weight class over the last several years. His accolades include:
 2016 Olympic Boxing Trials
 2015 Elite National Champion
 2015 Golden Gloves Champion
 2015 Sugar Ray Robinson Most Outstanding Boxer 
 2015 Connecticut Boxing Hall Of Fame Amateur Boxer Of The Year
 2015 Fairfield County Sports Person Of The Year
 2014 USA Elite Mens Silver Medalist 
 2013 USA Elite Mens Bronze Medalist 
 2013 Northeast Regional Champion
 2013, 2014 New York Metro Champion (165 lbs)
 2012, 2013, 2014 New York Boxing Champion (165 lbs)
 2012, 2013 Pure Breed Champion  
 2012 Adidas National PAL Champion 
 2012 Elite Heat Champion 
 2011 Golden Champion 
 2011 Most Outstanding Novice

Professional career 
Booker made his professional debut on March 5, 2016, scoring a 2nd-round TKO against Antonio Allen at the Sands Bethlehem Event Center in Bethlehem, Pennsylvania.

Since his pro debut, his personal and professional stories have been featured in several national and local news outlets, including Complex on Fox 5 NY

Personal life 
After avoiding jail time and receiving three years probation for gun and narcotics charge as a juvenile, Booker took up training in Stamford, Connecticut under former light heavyweight pro Ahmed Mickens at Revolution Training and Fitness, where he also works as a personal trainer.

Between fights, Booker works as a personal trainer at Revolution Training in Stamford, CT. Additionally, he coaches Golden Gloves fighters Jacqueline Boyle (132) and Catie Ramsey (125), as well as MMA fighters Kastriot Xhema and Theodore Macuka.

Booker appeared in a 2017 MSNBC commercial for Hardball with Chris Matthews with the host. He made his modeling debut along with former WWE Diva Summer Rae at the September 2018 New York Fashion Week runway show for designer ACID NYC.  In 2019 he starred in a commercial and was featured in print advertising for SentinelOne.

In November 2018, Booker launched the "Go The Distance Foundation" at Trailblazers Academy in Stamford.  Booker said: “The No. 1 thing I want to do is break down the barriers between at-risk youth and the police. I don’t want our kids to think they can’t have a conversation with a police officer. I want to create a place with an atmosphere where we can create a dialog and conversation with both points of view."

"The Boxer" Documentary 
Booker will be the subject of a documentary short that will premiere in November 2016 at three film festivals: DOC NYC, the Big Apple Film Festival, and New York Short Film Festival.  The film is directed by Craig Cutler and produced by Fela Cortes.

DOC NYC description reads:The Boxer is an intimate portrait of Chordale Booker, a gifted USA boxer and National Champion with a storied past. Following a court ruling that afforded Chordale a second chance at life, he vowed to make right and fight his battles in the place he knew best, the ring. Follow his tumultuous journey through the lens of director and photographer, Craig Cutler.The film was awarded the Big Apple Film Festival's Best Short Documentary.

References

External links 
 Official website
 
 Go The Distance Foundation

Living people
1991 births
American male boxers
Light-middleweight boxers
Boxers from Connecticut
Sportspeople from Stamford, Connecticut